The eighth and final season of American crime-comedy-drama television series Castle was ordered on May 7, 2015, by ABC. The season premiered on September 21, 2015, in the United States on ABC, and the finale aired on May 16, 2016. The season consisted of 22 episodes.

On April 18, 2016, ABC and ABC Productions announced that Stana Katic and Tamala Jones would not return for Castles ninth season, should it be renewed. Despite several other cast members having signed on for a ninth season, on May 12, 2016, it was announced that the show would be cancelled instead; the final episode aired on May 16, 2016.

Overview
Richard Castle (Fillion) is a famous mystery novelist who has killed off the main character in his popular book series and has writer's block. He is brought in by the NYPD for questioning regarding a copy-cat murder based on one of his novels. He is intrigued by this new window into crime and murder, and uses his connection with the mayor to charm his way into shadowing Detective Kate Beckett (Katic). Castle decides to use Beckett as his muse for Nikki Heat, the main character of his next book series. Beckett, an avid reader of Castle's books, initially disapproves of having Castle shadow her work, but later warms up and recognizes Castle as a useful resource in her team's investigations.

Cast

Main cast
 Nathan Fillion as Richard Castle
 Stana Katic as Captain Kate Castle
 Jon Huertas as Dt. Javier Esposito
 Seamus Dever as Dt. Kevin Ryan
 Tamala Jones as Dr. Lanie Parish
 Molly C. Quinn as Alexis Castle
 Susan Sullivan as Martha Rodgers
 Toks Olagundoye as Hayley Shipton

Recurring cast
 Sunkrish Bala as Vikram Singh
 Juliana Dever as Jenny Ryan

Episodes

Production

Development
Castle was renewed for an eighth season on May 7, 2015. Following the seventh season, David Amann stepped down as showrunner, and writer Terence Paul Winter and Alexi Haley were hired as the new showrunners for the eighth season. TVLine announced on July 7, 2015, that Toks Olagundoye had been added as a series regular for the eighth season, playing former Scotland Yard police officer Hayley Vargas. Filming for the eighth season started on July 17, 2015, and ended in April 2016. A promotional poster was released on August 10, 2015, by ABC.

Final season speculation
The eighth season was speculated as being the final season of Castle. After the seventh season, both Nathan Fillion's and Stana Katic's contracts expired, and new contract negotiations began before the seventh season ended. It was reported on April 16, 2015, that Fillion renewed his contract for an eighth season, while Katic renewed hers on May 12, 2015. However, in January 2016, speculation began that the series might move on without Fillion and Katic as their contracts were due to expire again after the eighth season. After March 3, 2016, when ABC renewed most of their shows, Castle was one of the few shows excluded, adding to the rumors. It was also rumored that if the show were to be renewed for a ninth season, it was only going to be renewed for 13 episodes by ABC and would most likely not premiere until mid-season in 2017 and would only have 6 cast members, with the departure of Katic and Jones, despite the show usually having 8 cast members. TVLine reported on April 5, 2016, that the producers were filming multiple endings for the season in case the show was cancelled. Co-showrunner Alexi Hawley commented on the report saying "There’s stuff up in the air, so we are trying to leave it in a very dynamic way which leaves open the possibility that maybe the show won’t come back in the same form next season — although, again, we really hope that it does." 

Two days later, Deadline announced that Stana Katic would not return for a potential ninth season, as well as Tamala Jones, who had been on the show since the first season. The reason given was due to budgetary decisions made by ABC. On May 5, 2016, TVLine reported that Fillion had signed up for a potential ninth season. A few days later, it was announced that Seamus Dever had signed up for a ninth season, while co-stars Jon Huertas, Molly Quinn, Susan Sullivan and Toks Olagundoye were in finalizing deals with their contracts. Huertas was announced to have renewed his contract on May 11, 2016. Despite lead actor Fillion and other cast members signing on for a potential ninth season, Castle was cancelled on May 12, 2016.

DVD release

References

2015 American television seasons
2016 American television seasons
Season 8